Babul Ka Angna is a Pakistani television soap opera which aired on Geo Entertainment. First episode was aired on 13 January 2016. Soap aired throughout weekdays with half an hour episode. Drama based upon social issues which are increasing effectively in our society.

Cast
Maham Amir as Mehwish
Saleem Sheikh
Ghazala Butt as Rubina
Mohsin Gillani
Hiba Aziz
Sumbul Ansari
Anas Yasin
Shan Baig
Farzana Thaeem
Sophia Ahmed
Ikram Abbasi
Aruba Mirza
Sajid Shah
Sami Sani
Majida Hameed
Saba Khan
Nadia Kanwal
Ahsan Shah
Humera Arif
Huma Rehan
Asiya Naz

References

2016 Pakistani television series debuts
Pakistani television series
Pakistani drama television series
Geo TV original programming
Urdu-language television shows